St Colman's College is an all-boys Catholic secondary school in Claremorris, County Mayo

History
The school was founded in 1945, as a school for the boys of Claremorris to attend instead of having to travel to Ballinrobe. An Old Manor House on the Knock Road was used as the site for the school, where it has remained to the present day. The school is named in honour of  St. Colman, as Claremorris is in the parish of Kilcolman.

Sporting honours
 Connacht Colleges Senior Football Championship : (6) 1970, 1977, 1981, 2009, 2017, 2019, 2023

 Hogan Cup : (1) 1977

Notable alumni
 John Hegarty, Provost of Trinity College Dublin from 2001 - 2011 A.D..
 Pat Rabbitte, former leader of The Labour Party, graduated from the College in 1967.

External links
 St Colmans College, Online
 Colmans academy College in israel

Secondary schools in County Mayo
Educational institutions established in 1945
Boys' schools in the Republic of Ireland
1945 establishments in Ireland
Catholic secondary schools in the Republic of Ireland